Helena Margareta Höij, born 20 December 1965 in Angered, is a Swedish Christian Democratic politician, She was a member of the Riksdag from 1998 to 2006 and the Third Deputy Speaker of the Riksdag from 2002 to 2006.

References

1965 births
21st-century Swedish women politicians
Linköping University alumni
Living people
Members of the Riksdag 1998–2002
Members of the Riksdag 2002–2006
Members of the Riksdag from the Christian Democrats (Sweden)
Women members of the Riksdag